Berlin is a German civil parish (Ortsteil) of the municipality of Seedorf, in the district of Segeberg, Schleswig-Holstein. With 520 inhabitants in 2011, it is the most populated settlement of the municipality.

History
First mentioned in 1215, it is considered as the oldest "Berlin" in the world.

Geography
Berlin is located in the natural park of the Holsteinische Schweiz, not too far from the Seekamp lake, and its principal roads link Eutin and Ahrensbök to Bornhöved.

Tourism
Due to its name, the Little Berlin is a receptive place for some tourists. Several references to the capital are located in the village, as for example the name of many streets and squares, as Potsdamer Platz, the central Potsdamer Straße, Kurfürstendamm, Unter den Linden, Wilmersdorfer Straße, Lichterfelde, Uhlandstraße and Heerstraße. In Potsdamer Platz is located a stone, placed on June 18, 1964, with an inscription representing the bear symbol of the capital and another recording "BERLIN 357 km berlin".

Gallery

References

External links

 Berlin webpage on Seedorf site
Berliner pictures on Panoramio

Villages in Schleswig-Holstein

de:Seedorf (Kreis Segeberg)#Berlin